The Arros is a right tributary of the Adour, in the Southwest of France.

Name 
The name Arros is based on the root Arr- 'stone' and the suffix -os.

Geography 
The Arros rises in the Baronnies of Pyrenees, southeast of Bagnères-de-Bigorre, below the Signal de Bassia (1 921 m).

It flows north through a narrow valley defended by the castle of Mauvezin and the bastide of Tournay. It joins the Adour before it turn west, upstream from Riscle.

Départements and towns 
Hautes-Pyrénées: Bourg-de-Bigorre, Tournay, Chelle-Debat
Gers: Montégut-Arros, Villecomtal-sur-Arros, Plaisance.

Main tributaries 
(L) Esqueda, from Banios
(L) Luz, from Lies
(L) Arredou, in Tournay
(L) Arret Daban or Arret Devant, 
(L) Arret Darré, in Gonez
(R) Bouès, from Capvern

References

Rivers of France
Rivers of Gers
Rivers of Hautes-Pyrénées
Rivers of Occitania (administrative region)